Mitchell House is a six-storey Streamline Moderne art-deco commercial building in Melbourne, Australia. It was designed as a ten-storey building of 132 ft (40 meters), which was the height limit at that time. Out of the ten storeys, six storeys were built.

The building is located on the corner of Lonsdale Street and Elizabeth Street. Its exact address is at 352-362 Lonsdale Street.

Australian architect Harry Norris planned a ten-storey building, the top four floors of which were never added to the first stage, which was completed in 1937. His client, Thos. Mitchell & Co, manufactured and distributed brushes.

The building was classified on 9 July 1987 and added to the Victorian Heritage Database and that of the National Trust.

References

Streamline Moderne architecture in Australia
Office buildings in Melbourne
Art Deco architecture in Melbourne
Commercial buildings completed in 1937
Harry Norris buildings
Heritage-listed buildings in Melbourne
Elizabeth Street, Melbourne
Buildings and structures in Melbourne City Centre